Kaf Hachayim (translation: "the palm of life") is the title of two widely cited codes of Jewish law. It may refer to:

a work by Rabbi Yaakov Chaim Sofer
a work by Rabbi Hayim Palaggi

Rabbinic legal texts and responsa